Lowri is a Welsh feminine given name. Notable people with the name include:

Lowri Gwilym (1954–2010), Welsh television and radio producer
Lowri Morgan, Welsh television presenter and marathon runner
Lowri Shone (born 1996), English ballerina
Lowri Turner (born 1964), British fashion journalist and television presenter
Lowri Tynan (born 1987), Welsh swimmer

Welsh feminine given names